Leszczyc (Bróg, Brożek, Brożyna, Laska, Laski, Wyszowie), herb szlachecki - is a Polish coat of arms. It was used by several szlachta families in the times of the Polish–Lithuanian Commonwealth.

History

Blazon

Notable bearers
Notable bearers of this coat of arms include:
Wirydianna Fiszerowa
Florian Laskary of Kościelec, Bishop to Bolesław II of Masovia
Piotr Wysz Radoliński, who worked for Jadwiga of Poland as Chancellor and was a signatory to two acts of Union with Lithuania.

See also
 Polish heraldry
 Heraldry
 Coat of arms

References

 Coat of arms Leszczyc on http://www.jurzak.pl/

Polish coats of arms